Luis Oruezábal López (13 May 1952 – 31 December 2014) was an Argentine footballer who played as a forward.

Football career
Born in Buenos Aires to Spanish parents that emigrated from Burgos in the 1940s, Oruezábal played for Club Atlético Vélez Sarsfield in his country, returning to the land of his ancestors in early 1974 after signing for Granada CF and also representing Andalusia neighbours Real Jaén, retiring in 1980 at only 28 due to a serious injury.

Oruezábal made his debut in La Liga on 28 April 1974, playing 60 minutes in a 0–2 away loss against Racing de Santander.

Post-retirement / Death
After retiring settled in Granada, going on to manage a restaurant alongside fellow footballer Ladislao Mazurkiewicz named Chikito.

On 31 December 2014, emergency crews were called to his residence where four people, including himself, were found unconscious. Three were resuscitated and taken to hospital, but he eventually died at the age of 62. The house contained carbon monoxide coming from a wood-burning fireplace, installed in the basement of the house with improper ventilation.

References

External links

1952 births
2014 deaths
Argentine people of Basque descent
Footballers from Buenos Aires
Argentine footballers
Association football forwards
Argentine Primera División players
Club Atlético Vélez Sarsfield footballers
La Liga players
Segunda División players
Granada CF footballers
Real Jaén footballers
Pan American Games medalists in football
Pan American Games gold medalists for Argentina
Argentine expatriate footballers
Expatriate footballers in Spain
Argentine expatriate sportspeople in Spain
Deaths from carbon monoxide poisoning
Footballers at the 1971 Pan American Games
Medalists at the 1971 Pan American Games